The Federal Constitutional Court is the supreme constitutional court for the Federal Republic of Germany, established by the constitution or Basic Law of Germany. Since its inception with the beginning of the post-World War II republic, the court has been located in the city of Karlsruhe, which is also the seat of the Federal Court of Justice.

The main task of the Federal Constitutional Court is judicial review, and it may declare legislation unconstitutional, thus rendering them ineffective. In this respect, it is similar to other supreme courts with judicial review powers, yet the court possesses a number of additional powers and is regarded as among the most interventionist and powerful national courts in the world. Unlike other supreme courts, the constitutional court is not an integral stage of the judicial or appeals process (aside from cases concerning constitutional or public international law), and does not serve as a regular appellate court from lower courts or the Federal Supreme Courts on any violation of federal laws.

The court's jurisdiction is focused on constitutional issues and the compliance of all governmental institutions with the constitution. Constitutional amendments or changes passed by the parliament are subject to its judicial review since they have to be compatible with the most basic principles of the  defined by the eternity clause.

Scope 
The Basic Law of the Federal Republic of Germany stipulates that all three branches of the state (the legislature, executive, and judiciary) are bound directly by the constitution in Article 20, Section 3 of the document. As a result, the court can rule acts of any branches unconstitutional, whether as formal violations (exceeding powers or violating procedures) or as material conflicts (when the civil rights prescribed in the Grundgesetz are not respected).

The powers of the Federal Constitutional Court are defined in article 93 of the Grundgesetz.
This constitutional norm is set out in a federal law, the Federal Constitutional Court Act (BVerfGG), which also defines how decisions of the court on material conflicts are put into force. The Constitutional Court has therefore several strictly defined procedures in which cases may be brought before it:
 Constitutional complaint: By means of the Verfassungsbeschwerde (constitutional complaint) any person may allege that his or her constitutional rights have been violated. Although only a small fraction of these are actually successful (ranging around 2.5% since 1951), several have resulted in major legislation being invalidated, especially in the field of taxation. The large majority of the court's procedures fall into this category; 135,968 such complaints were filed from 1957 to 2002.
 Abstract regulation control: Several political institutions, including the governments of the Bundesländer (states), may bring a federal law before the court if they consider it unconstitutional. A well-known example of this procedure was the 1975 abortion decision, which invalidated legislation intended to decriminalise abortion.
 Specific regulation control: Any regular court which is convinced, that a law in question for a certain case is not in conformance with the constitution must suspend that case and bring this law before the Federal Constitutional Court.
 Federal dispute: Federal institutions, including members of the Bundestag, may bring internal disputes over competences and procedures before the court.
 State–federal dispute: The Länder may bring disputes over competences and procedures between the states and federal institutions before the court.
 Investigation committee control
 Federal election scrutiny: Violations of election laws may be brought before the court by a political institution or any involved voter.
 Impeachment procedure: Impeachment proceedings may be brought against the Federal President, a judge, or a member of one of the Federal Supreme Courts, by the Bundestag, the Bundesrat or the federal government, based on violation of constitutional or federal law.
 Prohibition of a political party: Article 21 of the Basic Law gives the Constitutional Court the power to ban political parties that either threaten the existence of Germany or "seek to undermine or abolish the free democratic basic order". This has happened just twice, both times in the 1950s: the Socialist Reich Party (SRP), a neo-Nazi group, was banned in 1952, and the Communist Party of Germany (KPD) was banned in 1956. A 2003 attempt to ban another neo-Nazi party, the National Democratic Party of Germany (NPD), failed when it was revealed that a significant proportion of its leadership were informants for the Federal Office for the Protection of the Constitution.

Up to 2009, the Constitutional Court had struck down more than 600 laws as unconstitutional.

Organization 
The court consists of two senates, each of which has eight members, headed by a senate chairperson. The members of each senate are allocated to three chambers for hearings in constitutional complaint and single regulation control cases. Each chamber consists of three judges, so each senate chair is at the same time a member of two chambers. The court publishes selected decisions on its website and since 1996 a public relations department promotes selected decisions with press releases.

Decisions by a senate require a majority. In some cases a two-thirds vote is required. Decisions by a chamber need to be unanimous. A chamber is not authorized to overrule a standing precedent of the senate to which it belongs; such issues need to be submitted to the senate as a whole. Similarly, a senate may not overrule a standing precedent of the other senate, and such issues will be submitted to a plenary meeting of all 16 judges (the Plenum).

Unlike all other German courts, the court often publishes the vote count on its decisions (though only the final tally, not every judge's personal vote) and even allows its members to issue a dissenting opinion. This possibility, introduced only in 1971, is a remarkable deviation from German judicial tradition.

One of the two senate chairs is also the president of the court, the other one being the vice president. The presidency alternates between the two senates, i.e. the successor of a president is always chosen from the other senate. The 10th and current president of the court is Stephan Harbarth.

Democratic function 

The Constitutional Court actively administers the law and ensures that political and bureaucratic decisions comply with the rights of the individual enshrined in the Basic Law. Specifically, it can vet the democratic and constitutional legitimacy of bills proposed by federal or state government, scrutinise decisions (such as those relating to taxation) by the administration, arbitrate disputes over the implementation of law between states and the federal government and (most controversially) ban non-democratic political parties. The Constitutional Court enjoys more public trust than the federal or state parliaments, which possibly derives from the German enthusiasm for the rule of law.

Appointment of judges 

The court's judges are elected by the Bundestag (the German parliament) and the Bundesrat (a legislative body that represents the sixteen state governments on the federal level). According to the Basic Law, each of these bodies selects four members of each senate. The election of a judge requires a two-thirds vote (but this supermajority requirement is not constitutionally mandated by the Basic Law, only by normal law). The selection of the chairperson of each senate alternates between Bundestag and Bundesrat and also requires a two-thirds vote.

Up until 2015, the Bundestag delegated this task to a special committee (Richterwahlausschuss, judges election committee), consisting of a small number of Bundestag members. This procedure had caused some constitutional concern and was considered to be unconstitutional by many scholars. In 2015, the Bundesverfassungsgerichtsgesetz (law code of the Federal Constitutional Court) was changed in this respect. In this new system, it is the Bundestag itself that elects judges to the court, and this by secret ballot in the plenum. To be selected, candidates must get a two-thirds majority of those present at the vote, and provided that the number of votes in favor constitutes an absolute majority of the total membership of the Bundestag, including those not present at the vote. The Richterwahlausschuss only retains the power to nominate candidates. This new procedure was applied for the first time in September 2017, when Josef Christ was elected to the first senate as the successor of Wilhelm Schluckebier.
In the Bundesrat, a chamber in which the governments of the sixteen German states are represented (each state has 3 to 6 votes depending on its population, which it has to cast en bloc), a candidate currently needs at least 46 of 69 possible votes.

The judges are in principle elected for a 12-year term, though they must retire upon reaching the age of 68 regardless of how much of the 12 years they have served. Re-election is not possible. A judge must be at least 40 years old and must be a well-trained jurist. Three out of eight members of each senate have served as a judge on one of the federal courts. Of the other five members of each senate, most judges previously served as academic jurists at a university, as public servants or as a lawyer. After ending their term, most judges withdraw themselves from public life. However, there are some prominent exceptions, most notably Roman Herzog, who was elected President of Germany in 1994, shortly before the end of his term as president of the court.

Current members

Presidents of the court 
The court's head is the president of the Federal Constitutional Court, who chairs one of the two senates and joint sessions of the court, while the other senate is chaired by the vice president of Federal Constitutional Court. The right to elect the president and the vice president alternates between the Bundestag and the Bundesrat. If the president of the Federal Constitutional Court leaves office, i.e. when his or her term as judge at the court ends, the legislative body, whose turn it is to choose the president, has to elect one of the judges of the senate, of which the former president wasn't a member, with a two-thirds majority. If the office of the vice president falls vacant, a new vice president is elected from the senate, of which the sitting president is not a member, by the legislative body, which has not elected the former vice president. The given legislative body is free to elect the judge it prefers, but with respect to the position of president, it has been always the sitting vice president, who was elected president, since 1983.

As he or she is the highest-ranking representative of the judicial branch of government, the president of the Federal Constitutional Court ranks fifth in the German order of precedence.

Criticism 
The court has been subject to criticism. This behavior has been interpreted as a hindrance to the normal functioning of the parliament.

Another criticism of the federal constitutional court issued by the former president of the Federal Intelligence Service, Dr. August Hanning, is that the court tends to overprotect people, according to him, even members of ISIS. He considers that to hinder the efficiency of German intelligence agencies in favour of protecting people in far-away countries.

Finally, numerous decisions have been criticised and sparked demonstrations.

Landmark decisions

Impact on European constitutional questions

On 12 September 2012, the Court stated that the question of whether the ECB's decision to finance European constituent nations through the purchase of bonds on the secondary markets was ultra vires because it exceeded the limits established by the German act approving the ESM was to be examined.  This demonstrates how a citizen's group has the ability to affect the conduct of European institutions. On 7 February 2014, the Court made a preliminary announcement on the case, which was to be published in full on 18 March. In its ruling, the Court decided to leave judgment to the Court of Justice of the EU (CJEU).

See also 
 List of justices of the Federal Constitutional Court
 Judiciary
 Rechtsstaat
 Rule according to higher law
 Rule of law
 Streitbare Demokratie
 Federal Office for the Protection of the Constitution

Notes

Further reading

References

Bibliography

External links

 
 Federal Constitutional Court Act (BVerfGG) 
 Federal Constitutional Court Act (BVerfGG) – web archive 
 Federal Constitutional Court Act (BVerfGG) – germanlawarchive  
 Federal Constitutional Court Act (BVerfGG) – germanlawarchive at 20180609  

Courts in Germany
Germany
Germany
German constitutional law
Karlsruhe
1951 establishments in West Germany
Courts and tribunals established in 1951